Marble Arch is a landmark in London, UK.

Marble Arch may also refer to:

Places
 Marble Arch tube station, an underground train station in London, UK
 Marble Arch (Libya), a now-demolished landmark on the Coastal Highway in Libya
 Marble Arch, a natural limestone arch located in the Marble Arch Caves Global Geopark, in Northern Ireland
 Marble Arch Caves, a cave system in Northern Ireland
 Marble Arch Cave (Gibraltar), a cave on Gibraltar
 Marble Arch Mound, a temporary, artificial hill located next to Marble Arch in London, UK

Other uses
 Marble Arch Records, a British record label
 Odeon Marble Arch, a cinema in London, UK
 Western Marble Arch Synagogue, a Jewish place of worship in central London, UK